Russian government ownership of various companies and organizations, collectively known as state-owned enterprises (SOEs), still play an important role in the national economy. The approximately 4,100 enterprises that have some degree of state ownership accounted for 39% of all employment in 2007 (down from over 80% in 1990). In 2007, SOEs controlled 64% of the banking sector, 47% of the oil and gas sector, and 37% of the utility sector.

State corporations are established by the Russian government to boost industrial sectors. Rosstat figures show that 529,300 enterprises are partly or wholly owned by the state, of which between 30,000 and 31,000 are commercial companies (generating revenue). The 54 largest enterprises account for over two-thirds of the total revenues generated by state-owned organizations. SOEs account for 40% of the capitalization on the Russian stock market, one of the highest shares in the world.

Legal form

Russian state-owned companies are typically established under the legal form of joint stock companies (OAO or ZAO), unitary enterprises (federal, regional or municipal), or state corporations.

Joint stock companies
OAO and PAO are forms of open joint-stock companies, while ZAO (and AO) are closed joint-stock companies.

The Federal Agency for State Property Management is authorized by the Russian government to exercise shareholder rights for federally-owned shares in companies and is responsible for the preparation and nomination of candidates at the annual meetings of shareholders. As a general rule, Rosimushchestvo nominates to a company's board of directors representatives of the most relevant government body, based on the sectoral characteristics of the business. The sectoral state body thus participates in managing the company through its representatives.

Non-profit organizations

State corporation

A state corporation defined by Article 7.1 of NCO Law is a non-profit organization which manages its assets as described in its charter. State Corporations are not obliged to submit to public authorities documents accounting for activities (except for a number of documents submitted to the Russian government) and, as a rule, are subordinate not to the government, but to the Russian president, and act to accomplish some important goal. Control by the Government is implemented on the basis of annual corporation meetings, an annual report on the audit opinion of accounting and financial reporting (accounting), as well as the conclusion of the auditing commission on the results of verification of financial (accounting) statements and other corporation documents. Any other central government departments, organs of state power of subjects of the Russian Federation, and the local governments have no right to interfere in the activities of State corporations.

These state corporations (a non-profit) establishing under a Russian federal law are different from all the other organizations referred to in the mass media as "state corporations". According to the law, a state corporation is wholly owned by the Russian Federation directly, bypassing the Federal Agency for State Property Management.

State company
A state company defined by Article 7.2 of NCO Law is a non-membership non-profit organization. Each state company is created by a separate Russian federal law.

These state companies (a non-profit) establishing only under a federal law are different from all the other organizations referred to in the mass media as "state companies".

Unitary enterprise

A unitary enterprise is a commercial organization that have no ownership rights to the assets used in their operations. This form is possible only for state and municipal enterprises, operating with state or municipal property, respectively. The owners of the property of a unitary enterprise have no responsibility for its operation, and vice versa.

The assets of unitary enterprises belong to the central government (in which case they are known as federal state unitary enterprises), a Russian region, or a municipality. A unitary enterprise holds assets under the right of economic management (for both state and municipal unitary enterprises) or operative management (for state unitary enterprises only), and that such assets may not be distributed among the participants, nor otherwise divided. A unitary enterprise is independent in economic issues and obliged only to give its profits to the state. Unitary enterprises would have no right to set up subsidiaries, but, with the owner's consent, can open branches and representation offices.

As of January 2017, there are 1,120 federal state unitary enterprises in Russia.

Companies

Information on the legal form of companies is drawn from the open-data portal of the Federal Agency for State Property Management, unless otherwise stated.

Privatization

Since the first waves of privatization in the 1990s, the Russian government has sold stakes in several companies, often while continuing to hold a significant degree of ownership. In 2016 this included the sale 10.9% of Alrosa, and 19.5% of Rosneft. Privatization plans for the 2017-2019 period include selling stakes in VTB (10.9%), Sovcomflot (25% minus 1 share), and Novorossiysk Commercial Sea Port.

See also
 Federal Agency for State Property Management
 List of strategic organizations of Russia
 Media of Russia
 Privatization in Russia

References

External links
 Register of enterprises owned by the Russian Federation, state corporations and economic associations, the shares (stakes) of which are owned by the Russian Federation - Federal Agency for State Property Management

 
Russia